The 1789 English cricket season was the 18th in which matches have been awarded retrospective first-class status and the third after the foundation of Marylebone Cricket Club. It featured 14 first-class matches.

The French Revolution escalated after the Storming of the Bastille on 14 July when cricket patron John Frederick Sackville, 3rd Duke of Dorset, was the British ambassador in Paris. Dorset was reportedly planning a goodwill visit to France by an England team, but the crisis forced him to return home and the venture was cancelled before the team could leave England.

Matches 
A total of 14 first-class matches were played during the season and involved teams from each of Essex, Hampshire, Kent, Middlesex and Surrey. An England side took part in three matches, two against the Hampshire XI and one against the Kent XI while a Gentlemen of England side played against the Middlesex XI. There were two matches between teams from West Kent and East Kent and a team from Hornchurch Cricket Club hosted MCC in August. A match between teams named A to M and N to Z was played at Lord's Old Ground.

Proposed visit to Paris by an England team 
The British ambassador to France, the Duke of Dorset, a leading patron of cricket, planned the formation of an England team to visit Paris on a goodwill tour and play matches there in August. The team, captained by William Yalden, reportedly assembled in London and travelled to Dover on 10 August where, unexpectedly, they met the Duke himself coming the other way. He was returning to England following the escalation of the French Revolution and the venture was cancelled. According to John Major in More Than A Game, "the whole story is nonsense". On 16 July, two days after the Storming of the Bastille, Dorset had written to Foreign Secretary Francis Osborne, 5th Duke of Leeds, about the crisis and had warned other British residents to leave Paris so, Major contends, he would hardly have invited a cricket team to come to France at such a time.

Dorset is known to have left Paris on 8 August. He did not return and was temporarily replaced by his Embassy Secretary, Lord Robert Stephen FitzGerald, as Minister Plenipotentiary. New credentials were delivered by his official successor, Earl Gower, on 20 June 1790. Dorset's credentials were terminated on 29 June 1790. If the venture had gone ahead, it would have been the first-ever international cricket tour but, instead, it became the first to be cancelled for political reasons.

References

Further reading
 
 
 
 

1789 in English cricket
English cricket seasons in the 18th century